Phra Khanong Tai is a khwaeng (subdistrict) of Phra Khanong District, in Bangkok, Thailand. In 2020, it had a total population of 20,941 people.

References

Subdistricts of Bangkok
Phra Khanong district